The Barren River is a  river in western Kentucky, United States, and a tributary of the Green River. The watershed of the Green River is the largest of the twelve major river watersheds in Kentucky. The Barren River rises near the Tennessee border in Monroe County and flows into the Green in northeast Warren County. The drainage basin consists of Southcentral Kentucky and north-central Tennessee. 

Historically, this waterway was depicted as the “Big Barren River” in early surveys and documents to distinguish it from the Little Barren River.

At Greencastle, Kentucky, the river has a mean annual discharge of 2,501 cubic feet per second.

See also
List of Kentucky rivers

References

External links

Rivers of Kentucky
Rivers of Monroe County, Kentucky
Rivers of Warren County, Kentucky
Green River (Kentucky)